Salim in Iran may refer to:
Salim, Khuzestan
Salim, West Azerbaijan